Nordstemmen is a village and a municipality in the district of Hildesheim, in Lower Saxony, Germany. It is situated on the river Leine, approx. 10 km west of Hildesheim, and 25 km south of Hannover.

Subdivision 
Besides Nordstemmen proper, the municipality consists of the villages of Adensen, Barnten, Burgstemmen, Groß Escherde, Hallerburg, Heyersum, Klein Escherde, Mahlerten and Rössing.

Mayor 
The mayor is Nicole Dombrowski (independent), she was elected in September 2020.

Personalities 

 Rudolf Wiegmann (1804-1865), architect, painter and professor at the  Kunstakademie Düsseldorf

References

External links

Hildesheim (district)